Macrauzata submontana is a moth in the family Drepanidae. It was described by Jeremy Daniel Holloway in 1976. It is found on Borneo, Peninsular Malaysia, Sumatra and Java.

References

Moths described in 1976
Drepaninae